The men's long jump event  at the 1997 IAAF World Indoor Championships was held on March 7–8.

Medalists

Results

Qualification
Qualification: 7.95 (Q) or at least 12 best performers (q) qualified for the final.

Final

References

Long jump
Long jump at the World Athletics Indoor Championships